Dead Child is a heavy metal band from Louisville, Kentucky. The band played its first show at Lisa's Oak Street Lounge on August 19, 2006 with Pusher, Lords, and Blade of the Ripper.

During the 2005 Slint reunion tour, Pajo, Cook and McMahan decided that they wanted to play a more aggressive style of music akin to early Metallica, Iron Maiden, Judas Priest, and other metal bands that they admired as young fans.

The band has recorded an EP at Headbanging Kill Your Mama Music in Louisville. The EP was released on February 6, 2007 on the Cold Sweat label. They also performed their song "Never Bet the Devil Your Head" for the Burn to Shine DVD series.  The band's debut album Attack was released on April 8, 2008 on Quarterstick Records and was produced by Brad Wood. Their music video for "Sweet Chariot" received significant airplay on Headbangers Ball on MTV2 in the summer of 2008, and was voted by viewers as the best new video of the week on the Headbangers Ball website the week it debuted. The video was shot in April 2008 in a warehouse in downtown Louisville, KY that the band sometimes used as a rehearsal space and was produced and directed by Douglas Dillingham.

Members
Dead Child is notable for its members, all of whom have been in prominent indie rock and underground bands:

 David Pajo of Slint, Zwan, Tortoise, and numerous other projects
 Todd Cook of Shipping News, Crain, The Glasspack and the reunited Slint
 Michael McMahan of The For Carnation and the reunited Slint
 Tony Bailey of Crain and numerous other projects
 Dahm of Phantom Family Halo and Brothers of Conquest

References

External links
 

Musical groups from Louisville, Kentucky
Musical groups established in 2006
Heavy metal musical groups from Kentucky
2006 establishments in Kentucky